Köprülüzade Fazıl Ahmed Pasha (1635 – 3 November 1676) was an Ottoman nobleman and statesman, who belonged to the renowned Köprülü family of Albanian origin, which produced six grand viziers of the Ottoman Empire.

Life 
He was born into the Köprülü family, the son of Köprülü Mehmed Pasha and Ayşe Hatun (Hanım), daughter of Yusuf Ağa. His father was an Ottoman general of devshirme origin who in 1656 became Grand Vizier, while his mother was the daughter of a notable originally from Kayacık, a village of Havza in Amasya. His maternal grandfather was a voyvoda (tax-farmer) who built a bridge in Kadegra, that because of this was renamed Köprü, where his father Mehmed was stationed, and to which the Köprülü family owes its name.

He served as grand vizier from 1661 to 1676 after he inherited the title from his father. Prior to this appointment, he served as the Ottoman governor of the Damascus Eyalet (1660 to 1661) and the Erzurum Eyalet (1659 to 1660).

He was dubbed Fazıl, meaning "wise" (from the Arabic fazilet, meaning "wisdom"), for reducing taxation and promoting education. On the other hand, he was brutal in war. He led the Ottoman army in the Austro-Turkish War (1663–64). At the beginning of July 1664, he succeeded in destroying Novi Zrin in the northern part of the Kingdom of Croatia after nearly a month-long siege. Although defeated in the Battle of Saint Gotthard, he was able to gain territory by the Peace of Vasvár in 1664.

Following this treaty, he concentrated on the Cretan War and captured Candia (present-day Heraklion) from the Republic of Venice in 1669. At the end of the Polish–Ottoman War (1672–1676) against the Polish–Lithuanian Commonwealth, he signed the Treaty of Buchach in 1672 and the Treaty of Żurawno in 1676.

Contemporary European observers frequently remarked upon the atheistic tendencies of Fazıl Ahmed's inner circle of courtiers, and particularly those of Fazıl Ahmed himself. Nevertheless, his exact religious views remain unknown.

Fazıl Ahmed Pasha died on November 3, 1676, from complications resulting from his lifestyle of heavy drinking.

See also
 Köprülü family
 Köprülü era of the Ottoman Empire
 List of Ottoman Grand Viziers
 List of Ottoman governors of Damascus

References

External links
 

1635 births
1676 deaths
Fazil Ahmed
Albanian Grand Viziers of the Ottoman Empire
People from Vezirköprü
Koprulu, Fazil Ahmed
People of the Austro-Turkish War (1663–64)
Albanian Pashas
Ottoman governors of Damascus
Ottoman people of the Ottoman–Venetian Wars